Enzio Imaniel Ruel Boldewijn (born 17 November 1992) is a Dutch professional footballer who plays as a winger for Sutton United. 

He started his career in his native Netherlands before moving to England in 2016 to join Crawley Town.

Club career
Boldewijn began his career at SC Voorland in Amsterdam, before joining Utrecht. On 6 August 2011, Boldewijn made his Utrecht debut in a 0–0 draw against VVV-Venlo, in which he featured for 77 minutes before being replaced by Stefano Lilipaly.

On 1 July 2012, Boldewijn joined Eerste Divisie side FC Den Bosch on a season-long loan to gain first team experience. On 12 August 2012, Boldewijn made his FC Den Bosch debut in a 2–1 defeat against FC Oss, in which he featured up until the 80th minute before being replaced by Anthony van den Hurk. On 15 April 2013, Boldewijn scored his first FC Den Bosch goal in a 5–1 victory against Almere City, netting in the 63rd minute.

On 1 July 2013, Boldewijn joined Almere City upon the expiry of his contract with Utrecht. On 3 August 2013, Boldewijn made his Almere City debut in a 3–2 defeat against FC Volendam. On 27 September 2013, Boldewijn scored his first Almere City goal in a 3–1 victory over Helmond Sport, in which he netted Almere City's third goal. Boldewijn started to impress between his two final years at Almere City, with an impressive tally of fourteen goals in over sixty games.

Crawley Town

On 16 May 2016, Boldewijn agreed a deal to join League Two side Crawley Town on 1 July, upon his release from Almere City. On 6 August 2016, Boldewijn made his Crawley debut in a 1–0 victory against Wycombe Wanderers. Three days later, Boldewijn scored his first goal for Crawley in a 2–1 EFL Cup loss against Wolverhampton Wanderers. He was offered a new contract by Crawley at the end of the 2017–18 season.

Notts County
On 4 July 2018, Boldewijn joined League Two side Notts County on a three-year deal for an undisclosed six-figure fee. He was released at the end of the 2020/21 season by Notts County.

Sutton United
On 6 July 2021, Boldewijn joined newly promoted League Two side Sutton United on a free transfer.

Personal life
Born in the Netherlands, Boldewijn is of Surinamese descent.

Career statistics

References

External links
 Voetbal International profile 

1992 births
Living people
Dutch footballers
Dutch sportspeople of Surinamese descent
Association football forwards
FC Utrecht players
Eredivisie players
FC Den Bosch players
Almere City FC players
Crawley Town F.C. players
Notts County F.C. players
Sutton United F.C. players
Eerste Divisie players
English Football League players
National League (English football) players
Footballers from Almere
Dutch expatriate footballers
Expatriate footballers in England
Dutch expatriate sportspeople in England